The Burn of Myrehouse is a coastal stream in Aberdeenshire in northeast Scotland, the lower section of which, Getty Burn is a right bank tributary of River Deveron which discharges into Banff Bay. This watercourse has been suggested as an associated feature to the prehistoric feature at nearby Longman Hill.

See also
 Macduff, Aberdeenshire

References

Myrehouse